Gazeta Express is a newsportal owned by MediaWorks in the Republic of Kosovo. A new media company founded in 2005 by a group of senior editors and journalists with financing from IPKO, Kosovo's leading private telecommunications company. Initial group of founders include: Berat Buzhala, Petrit Selimi, Dukagjin Gorani, Ilir Mirena, Astrit Gashi, Arlinda Desku, Andrew Testa, Gjergj Filipaj, Bul Salihu, etc. First Editor-in-chief was Dukagjin Gorani (2005), followed by Berat Buzhala (2007). Company's first CEO was Petrit Selimi (2005), and was later followed by Baton Haxhiu (2007) and Shpend Jakupi (2010-2013). Current CEO is Leonard Kërquki..

See also
List of newspapers in Kosovo

External links
Gazeta Express on line
Gazeta Express Impressum
Article in Time magazine on Express
ABC News piece on Express

Newspapers published in Kosovo
Mass media in Pristina
Kosovan news websites